Sampara River is a river in the province of Southeast Sulawesi on the Sulawesi island, Indonesia, about 1800 km northeast of the capital Jakarta.

Geography

The river flows in the southeast area of Sulawesi with predominantly tropical monsoon climate (designated as Am in the Köppen-Geiger climate classification). The annual average temperature in the area is 23 °C. The warmest month is September, when the average temperature is around 26 °C, and the coldest is February, at 21 °C. The average annual rainfall is 2926 mm. The wettest month is May, with an average of 461 mm rainfall, and the driest is October, with 27 mm rainfall.

See also
List of rivers of Indonesia
List of rivers of Sulawesi

References

Rivers of Southeast Sulawesi
Rivers of Indonesia